Marie Dølvik Markussen (born 15 February 1997) is a Norwegian footballer who plays as a forward for Toppserien club Rosenborg. She made her debut for the Norway women's national football team in 2015.

Club career

After breaking through at her local lower division club Stakkevollan IF, Dølvik Markussen signed for Oslo-based Toppserien club Stabæk in November 2013 for a compensation payment of around 10.000 NOK. In December 2016, she moved on to VfL Wolfsburg, who simultaneously allowed another Norwegian Synne Jensen to return to Stabæk on a permanent basis. She went back to playing in Toppserien after joining Vålerenga in 2018. In November 2021, Dølvik Markussen joined Australian club Newcastle Jets for the 2021–22 A-League Women season.

International career
Following appearances for Norway at the youth international level, Dølvik Markussen made her senior debut for Norway at the 2015 Algarve Cup.

Personal life
In November 2012, 15-year-old Dølvik Markussen and her older brother Henning foiled an attempted burglary at their family home in Tromsø. She has over one hundred tattoos.  She had a romantic relationship with Ingrid Engen.

Honours

VfL Wolfsburg 

 Frauen-Bundesliga: 2016–17
 DFB-Pokal Frauen: 2016–17

Vålerenga 

 Toppserien
 Winner: 2020
 Runner-up: 2019
 Norwegian Women's Cup
 Winner: 2020, 2021
 Runner-up: 2017, 2019

References

External links

 
 

1997 births
Living people
Sportspeople from Tromsø
Toppserien players
Norwegian women's footballers
Norway women's international footballers
Norwegian expatriate women's footballers
VfL Wolfsburg (women) players
Expatriate women's footballers in Germany
Norwegian expatriate sportspeople in Germany
Stabæk Fotball Kvinner players
Women's association football forwards
Lesbian sportswomen
LGBT association football players
Norwegian LGBT sportspeople